Joel Armogasto Martinez (born May 15, 1983), professionally known as The Kid Mero, is a Dominican-American writer, comedian, TV personality, voice actor, YouTube personality, music blogger and Twitter personality. He rose to prominence alongside fellow Bronx native Desus Nice with their Complex TV 46-episode podcast Desus vs. Mero, which first premiered on December 18, 2013. He was a cast member of Guy Code with Desus Nice. He was the co-host of Viceland's Desus & Mero talk show alongside Desus until June 2018, and co-hosted Desus & Mero which premiered on February 21, 2019, on Showtime.

Early life 
Martinez was born in Washington Heights, Manhattan to Dominican immigrant parents. The Martinez family moved to the Bronx when he was young, and lived in a number of neighborhoods there; while Martinez mostly grew up in Tremont, he also spent time in Throggs Neck, Kingsbridge, Mount Eden, and Belmont, among other neighborhoods.

Martinez realized he was talented at comedy from a young age but was not particularly interested in televised comedy or stand-up comedians growing up. He attended P.S. 072 Dr. William Dorney, I.S. 117 Joseph H. Wade Intermediate School, and Monsignor Scanlan High School, from which he was expelled in ninth grade, before graduating from DeWitt Clinton High School. He then studied at Bronx Community College before briefly attending Hunter College, studying to be a science teacher while working as a teacher's assistant.

Martinez is Afro-Latino and grew up speaking Spanish. His father and uncle wanted to name him "Ramiro," but they were overruled by his mother. Nevertheless, his dad and uncle referred to him as "Ramiro" growing up, and when Martinez got into graffiti, he adopted the tag name "Miro," which he eventually changed to "Mero" because he liked how it looked better.

Career
Mero previously worked as a paraprofessional at I.S. 117, his alma mater. He began writing for Vice's music platform Noisey in 2012. His first article for them was published online on November 14, 2012; it was a review of Canadian electronic music duo Crystal Castles's album III. In total, he wrote 69 articles for Noisey between November 2012 and March 2014, most of which were album and mixtape reviews, and all written in caps lock.

Mero is a world record holder. In September 2014, Mero (with assistance) broke the record for kazoo solo. This came to light in an exclusive interview on Time Crisis with Ezra Koenig where Mero waxed on his illustrious accomplishment.

In December 2014, MTV announced that The Kid Mero and Desus Nice would be joining the cast of Guy Code for season 5, along with 11 other new cast members. They appeared on the first episode of season 5, which was originally aired on January 14, 2015.

On August 30, 2016, Viceland announced Desus & Mero which premiered on October 17, 2016. The half-hour show ran Monday-Thursday, hosted by the Bronx-reared comedic duo. Its finale aired on June 28, 2018. Mero most recently co-hosted Desus & Mero which premiered on February 21, 2019, on Showtime.

Personal life
Mero lives in Fair Lawn, New Jersey and is married to Heather Martinez, a teacher from New Jersey. The pair have four children: three boys and a girl.

Filmography

References

American male comedians
American people of Dominican Republic descent
21st-century American comedians
Living people
People from the Bronx
Comedians from New Jersey
1983 births
Place of birth missing (living people)
Late night television talk show hosts
Bronx Community College alumni